Mpho Gift Modise (born 1980) is a South African politician who has represented the African National Congress (ANC) in the Gauteng Provincial Legislature since 2019. A former ANC Youth League activist and civil servant, he was elected to his first term in the legislature in the 2019 general election.

Early life and career 
Modise was born in 1980 as Siphosami Sigasa, but changed his name in his childhood. He was raised in Zola, Soweto and in Sharpeville, where he attended primary school. He matriculated at Isizwe Sechaba Secondary School. While a student, he was active in the Congress of South African Students, and he later became active in the ANC and South African Communist Party; he ultimately became chairperson of his local ANC branch in Vereeniging and also served as Provincial Secretary of the ANC Youth League in Gauteng.

Before becoming a public representative, he worked in public administration at the Gauteng Youth Commission, the Office of the Gauteng Premier, the Gauteng Department of Infrastructure Development, and Emfuleni Local Municipality. He has a Bachelor of Arts in political science from the University of South Africa, as well as several postgraduate diplomas, including one from the Chinese Academy of Governance.

Legislative career 
Modise was elected to his first term in the legislature in the 2019 general election, ranked 33rd on the ANC's provincial party list. After the election he was elected to chair the legislature's Portfolio Committee on Infrastructure Development.

Personal life 
He has two daughters and a son.

References

External links 

 

African National Congress politicians
Living people
Members of the Gauteng Provincial Legislature
21st-century South African politicians
1980 births
University of South Africa alumni